Topher and  less commonly also Toph are abbreviations of the name Christopher.

Topher may also refer to:

Topher Campbell, British director of film, television and theatre
Topher Grace (born 1978), American actor
Topher Payne (born 1979), American playwright and screenwriter
Topher Ricketts (1955–2010), Filipino martial artist, teacher, actor and author
Topher, child Tiktok star

Others
Topher (comics), a fictional villain in the Marvel Comics series Runaways
Topher Brink, the fictional scientist in the series Dollhouse
 Topher, a character from Total Drama: Pahkitew Island